Yukon is a type of  patience or solitaire card game using a single deck of playing cards like Klondike, but there is no deck or stock, and manipulation of the tableau works differently.

Rules

Yukon has the following adjustments to the game-play of standard Klondike solitaire:
 There are 7 rows of tableau stacks, and 4 foundations that build up in suit (see screenshots to the right)
 Groups of cards can be moved; the cards below the one to be moved do not need to be in any order, except that the starting and target cards must be built in sequence and in alternate color. For example, a group starting with a Red 3 can be moved on top a Black 4, and the cards below the Red 3 can differ.
 There is no stock in Yukon. All cards are dealt at the beginning; however, some are face down.

Strategy
 Expose the face down cards as soon as possible, so you can start moving cards around.
 Moving the Aces to the Foundations as soon as possible is critical to gameplay.

Variations
Russian Solitaire is a solitaire card game that is very similar in layout and gameplay to Yukon. Its difference from Yukon is that building is by suit.  Other Yukon variants remove the usual restriction that only Kings be placed in empty tableau spaces.  Also closely related to Yukon are Alaska and Australian Patience.

References

External Sources
 Barry, Sheila Anne, World's Best Card Games for One
 Morehead, Albert H. & Mott-Smith, Geoffrey.  The Complete Book of Solitaire & Patience Games
 Moyse Jr, Alphonse. 150 Ways to play Solitaire
 Parlett, David.  The Penguin Book of Patience

See also 
 Klondike
 Australian Patience
 List of solitaires
 Glossary of solitaire

Half-open packers
Single-deck patience card games